"It Don't Mean a Thing (If It Ain't Got That Swing)" is a 1931 composition by Duke Ellington with lyrics by Irving Mills. It is now accepted as a jazz standard, and jazz historian Gunther Schuller characterized it as "now legendary" and "a prophetic piece and a prophetic title". In 2008, Ellington's 1932 recording of the song was inducted into the Grammy Hall of Fame.

Background
The music was composed and arranged by Ellington in August 1931 during intermissions at the Lincoln Tavern in Chicago; the lyrics were contributed by Irving Mills. According to Ellington, the song's title was the credo of trumpeter Bubber Miley, who was dying of tuberculosis at the time; Miley died the year the song was released.

The song was first recorded by Ellington and his orchestra for Brunswick Records on February 2, 1932. Ivie Anderson sang the vocal and trombonist Joe Nanton and alto saxophonist Johnny Hodges played the solos. In later performances, trumpeter Ray Nance often sang the vocal.

The song became famous, Ellington wrote, "as the expression of a sentiment which prevailed among jazz musicians at the time." It contains one of the earliest uses in popular music of the term "swing".

Other versions

 The Mills Brothers (1932)
 The Boswell Sisters (1932)
 Roger Wolfe Kahn (1932)
 Stephane Grappelli with Django Reinhardt (1935)
 Thelonious Monk – Thelonious Monk Plays the Music of Duke Ellington (Riverside, 1955)
 Sidney Bechet and Martial Solal – Sidney Bechet-Martial Solal Quartet Featuring Kenny Clarke (1957)
 Louis Armstrong and Duke Ellington – The Great Reunion (1961)
 Ella Fitzgerald and Duke Ellington – Ella and Duke at the Cote D'Azur (Verve, 1967)
 Teresa Brewer and Duke Ellington (1974)
 Chuck Brown – Go Go Swing Live (1987)
 Diane Schuur with Stan Getz – Schuur Thing (1985)
 Dr John - '' Duke Elegant (2000)

References

1931 compositions
Compositions by Duke Ellington
Songs about jazz
Songs with lyrics by Irving Mills